"Kol Meqadesh Shevi'i" is an ancient hymn, possibly composed by Moses b. Qalonymus. The hymn is first found in Add MS 27200, a 13th-century copy of the 11th-century Machzor Vitry, as the first hymn for the Sabbath; because the section with hymns does not appear in superior copies of Machzor Vitry, it is likely a later addition. Over the generations it has been set to many tunes. Ashkenazi Jews customarily sing it on Sabbath Eve.

Each stanza has four lines; the first three continue the acrostic and the fourth is a Biblical verse or verset.

Words

Content of the hymn 
The hymn praises those who keep the Sabbath, and stresses the reward waiting anyone who keeps the Sabbath. The hymn stresses the Sabbath experiences, the hope of the redemption of Jerusalem and the imminent rebuilding of the Temple.

Most prayerbooks omit the final stanza which completes the acrostic and instead insert the line "O LORD, god of Israel, eternal savior."

Abraham Abba of Pittsburgh, who did not realize that the acrostic was complete in manuscript, wrote an alternative final stanza:

Notes

References 

Sabbath
Hebrew-language songs
Zemirot